Henry Ronald Ward (born 29 March 1932) is an English former footballer who made 26 appearances in the Football League playing as a goalkeeper for Darlington in the 1950s. He was on the books of Tottenham Hotspur, without representing them in the League, and also played in the Southern League for Headington United.

References

1932 births
Living people
Footballers from Walthamstow
English footballers
Association football goalkeepers
Tottenham Hotspur F.C. players
Oxford United F.C. players
Darlington F.C. players
Southern Football League players
English Football League players